Early general elections were held in Barbados on 6 September 1994. The result was a victory for the opposition Barbados Labour Party, which won 19 of the 28 seats, with its leader Owen Arthur becoming Prime Minister. The ruling Democratic Labour Party led by David Thompson was reduced to only eight seats. The National Democratic Party became the first third party to win a seat since the Barbados National Party in 1966, with NDP leader, Richard Haynes, winning St. Michael South Central. Voter turnout was 60.9%.

Results

References

Barbados
1994 in Barbados
Elections in Barbados
September 1994 events in North America